The 2016 Wilmington mayoral election was held on Tuesday, November 8, 2016, to elect the mayor of Wilmington, Delaware. Incumbent mayor Dennis P. Williams ran for reelection to a second term, but was defeated in the Democratic primary on September 13, 2016 by Mike Purzycki, the former executive director of the Riverfront Development Corporation. Purzycki defeated Republican Robert Martin and Delaware Independent Steven Washington in the general election.

Democratic primary

Candidates
Maria Cabrera
Theo Gregory
Norm Griffiths
Kevin Kelley, City Councilman
Bob Marshall
Mike Purzycki, former executive director of the Riverfront Development Corporation
Dennis P. Williams, incumbent mayor
Eugene Young, advocacy director for the Delaware Center for Justice

Results

General election

Candidates
Robert Martin (R), real estate professional
Gerald Patterson (L), minister and entrepreneur (died August 31, 2016 and removed from ballot)
Mike Purzycki (D), former executive director of the Riverfront Development Corporation
Steven Washington (IPoD), teacher

Results

References

Wilmington Mayor
Wilmington
Wilmington Mayor 2016
Elections Mayor 2016